Neverbloom is the debut studio album by Australian metalcore band Make Them Suffer. The album was released on 25 May 2012 through Roadrunner Records and was produced by Roland Lim.

Critical reception

The album received positive reviews from critics. KillYourStereo gave the album a positive review and stated: "Roadrunner Records obviously considered Make Them Suffer worthy of promotion and Neverbloom for what it's worth seemingly justifies this support. Maybe for you Game of Throne lovers, this can be your unofficial soundtrack. Make Them Suffer's name has slowly yet gradually made its way into the local metal vocabulary over the last 12 to 18 months. Neverbloom thankfully highlights that this regard is for adequate reasons." Loud scored the album 85 out of 100 and said: "Overall, Neverbloom is a venomous and unrelenting offering of deathcore mixed with the band's various influences. Make Them Suffer may well become one of the biggest bands in their genre to come out of Australia."

Track listing

Personnel 
Credits adapted from Discogs.

Make Them Suffer
 Sean Harmanis – unclean vocals
 Nick McLernon – lead guitar, backing vocals
 Craig Buckingham – rhythm guitar
 Chris Arias-Real – bass
 Tim Madden – drums
 Louisa Burton – keyboards, piano, clean vocals

Additional personnel
 Roland Lim – production, mixing

Charts

References 

2012 debut albums
Make Them Suffer albums